Avrohom Elyashiv (c. 1877–1942) was the Av Beis Din of the city of Gomel (Homel)

Biography
Avrohom Levinson (later Elyashiv) was the son-in-law of the kabbalist, Shlomo Elyashiv, author of the Leshem Shevo V’Achlamah. He was also the father of Yosef Shalom Eliashiv. He studied under the Chofetz Chaim, Rabbi Yisrael Meir Kagan in Raduń Yeshiva and later in Dvinsk.

In 1924, he immigrated to Jerusalem along with his father-in-law, his wife Chaya Musha, and young son Yosef Shalom. Following advice from Kagan, he changed his family name from Levinson to that of his father-in-law so the family would have a uniform immigration certificate.

Rabbinic career
In Jerusalem, Elyashiv was granted  semicha by Rabbi Avraham Isaac Kook.

Eliyashiv founded and headed the yeshiva Tiferes Bochurim. The best bochurim would go to learn but the weaker ones went to work. Elyashiv, known as the Humeler Rov, felt badly for the young men who did not study  Torah so he founded Tiferes Bochurim, which was later headed by his son. He would wake his students at 3:00 A.M., study with them until 7:00, pray with them and send them off to work. 

Elyashiv was the author of Bikkurei Avrohom.

References

External links
 House of Nobility, Humble Abode: Rav Elyashiv and His Torah Dynasty in Mishpacha Magazine (free registration required to view)

People from Gomel
Haredi rabbis in Israel
Belarusian Haredi rabbis
Haredi rabbis in Mandatory Palestine
20th-century rabbis in Jerusalem
Year of birth uncertain
1942 deaths